Séverine Gipson (born 13 December 1970) is a French politician of La République En Marche! (LREM) who served as a member of the National Assembly since 2017.

Gipson was a quality engineer at the National Prevention and Protection Center (CNPP). She later served as the independent Mayor of Foucrainville from 2014 to 2017.

In the 2017 French legislative election, Gipson was the substitute candidate for Bruno Le Maire for Eure's 1st constituency. She succeeded Le Maire on 22 July 2017 when he was appointed Minister of the Economy and Finance. She subsequently resigned as Mayor of Foucrainville and was replaced by her deputy, Roselyne Conte.

In Parliament, Gipson served on the Defence Committee. In addition to her committee assignments, she was a member of the French parliamentary friendship group with Austria, Indonesia, Iceland, Namibia and Slovakia.

She lost her seat to Christine Loir from National Rally in the 2022 French legislative election.

References

External links
 Her page on the site of the National Assembly

1970 births
Living people
Women members of the National Assembly (France)
Deputies of the 15th National Assembly of the French Fifth Republic
21st-century French women politicians
La République En Marche! politicians
People from Évreux
Politicians from Normandy
Women mayors of places in France
Members of Parliament for Eure